Nikoloz (Niko) Beruchashvili ( August 21, 1947 — March 23, 2006) was a famous Georgian geographer and cartographer. Doctor of Geographical Sciences (1981), professor (1983).  The Vice president of the Geographical Society of Georgia (1998–2006). He introduced into the landscape science a new term of "STEX".

Biography 
In 1970 Nikoloz Beruchashvili finished the Faculty of Geography and Geology at Tbilisi State University. In 1982–2006 he was headed the chief of Cartography and Geoinformatics of Tbilisi State University. From 1979 to 2006 he was head of the scientific-research LAB studying the states of environment with aerospace methods and from 1970 until his death, he was chief Physical-Geographical Station of Martqopi. In 1995–2000 he was a professor of Soros Fund. In 2004 he was a founding chair of the International Geographical Union Commission on Landscape Analysis. In 2004–2006 he was a chair of the International Geographical Union’s Commission on Landscape Analysis. In 1981 defending his Doctor's degree at Moscow State University. He is the author of a theoretical concept of spatial-time analysis and synthesis in the landscape studies, which is introduced to the curricula of a number of universities. Beruchashvili with the Jean Radvanyi published "Geopolitical Atlas of the Caucasus" three times in the French and Georgian languages. Nikoloz Beruchashvili produced over 220 scientific works, of which 28 is monograph. Under his leadership 25 post-graduate students had maintained theses. The scientific adviser of 3 theses for a Doctor's degree. As the geographer has visited (attended) and worked in 60 various countries of the world. Nikoloz Beruchashvili was twice awarded the Order of Honor (2000, 2003).

Works  
 Beruchashvili, N. L. "Four dimensions of a landscape". Moscow: Mysl. 1986 (in Russian). 
 Beruchashvili, N. L. "Geophysics of landscape". Moscow: Visshaya shkola, 1990 (in Russian). 
 Beruchashvili, N. L. Radvanyi, Jean. "Geopolitical Atlas of the Caucasus". 1996; 1998; 2011.

References

Noticing 

1947 births
2006 deaths
Tbilisi State University alumni
Geographers from Georgia (country)
Scientists from Tbilisi
Recipients of the Order of Honor (Georgia)
20th-century cartographers